Brinda or Brindha may refer to:

Brinda (singer), Mauritian-British singer/songwriter
Brinda (choreographer), Indian dance choreographer
Brinda Karat (born 1947), Indian politician
Brinda Parekh (born 1982), Indian model and actress
Brindha Sivakumar, Indian singer
Brinda Somaya (born 1949), Indian architect and urban conservationist
T. Brinda (1912–1996), Carnatic music vocalist